Ansley is a given name. Notable people with the name include:

Ansley B. Borkowski (1898–1992), American lawyer and politician
Ansley Cargill (born 1982), American tennis player
Ansley Constance, Seychellois politician
Ansley J. Coale (1917–2002), American demographer
Ansley Truitt (born 1950), American basketball player
Ansley Wilcox (1856–1930), American scholar, lawyer and civil service reform commissioner